In Solaris, bcheck ( batch utility for Runtime Checking (RTC)), is a memory access and memory leak checking tool based on dbx.

External links
Studio 12.2 bcheck documentation

Debuggers
Unix programming tools
POSIX